José Lamberto Díaz Nieblas (born 27 August 1954) is a Mexican politician formerly affiliated with the Institutional Revolutionary Party. He served as Deputy of the LIX Legislature of the Mexican Congress representing Sonora, and previously served in the LVI Legislature of the Congress of Sonora.

References

1954 births
Living people
Politicians from Sonora
Institutional Revolutionary Party politicians
21st-century Mexican politicians
Universidad de Sonora alumni
Members of the Congress of Sonora
Deputies of the LIX Legislature of Mexico
Members of the Chamber of Deputies (Mexico) for Sonora